Sojasun is a Brittany-based French company created in 1988 that sells soy-based products. The soy is 100% produced in France. The company is part of the  company, which was founded in 1874.

The brand has about 50 different soja products in 5 different categories. About 17% of French people buy its products.

References

External links 

 History of Sojasun 

Companies based in Brittany
Ille-et-Vilaine
Soy products